Marc-Boris St-Maurice (b. 1969) is an activist, politician and Canadian musician, who has campaigned for many years for the legalization of cannabis, and to facilitate access to the drug for health reasons. He lives in Montreal, Quebec.

Music career
St-Maurice first became known in the early 1990s as bassist of punk band Grimskunk. It was then that Marc Saint-Maurice received the nickname "Boris". He left the band in 1999 to focus on his activism in the marijuana legalization movement.

Political career
In 1998, he founded the Bloc Pot, a Quebec provincial political party whose main objective was the decriminalization and eventual legalization of marijuana. In the Quebec general election of that year St-Maurice was the party's candidate in Mercier, placing fourth. In 2000, he created the federal equivalent of the Bloc Pot, the Marijuana Party, which ran candidates in federal elections. That year, St-Maurice was the party's candidate on two separate occasions, first in the byelection to replace resigning Okanagan—Coquihalla MP Jim Hart, then in Laurier—Sainte-Marie in the November general election. While ultimately unsuccessful, St-Maurice's candidacy in the November federal election was an unprecedented result for both St-Maurice and the  Marijuana Party. He managed to best the candidates of three major parties (the New Democratic Party, the Progressive Conservatives, and the Canadian Alliance) a relatively rare feat for a minor party. In 2001, St-Maurice returned to Quebec politics to contest the byelection in Jonquière, prompted by the resignation of Lucien Bouchard. The next year he was a candiddate in the federal byelection in Saint-Léonard—Saint-Michel, placing last. His final foray into federal politics came in 2004, where he stood as a candidate in LaSalle—Émard, the riding of then Prime Minister Paul Martin. 

In February 2005, Saint-Maurice left the Marijuana Party to join the Liberal Party of Canada, arguing that the chances of reaching the objectives pursued by both cannabis rights parties were better in the then ruling party. The movement for marijuana had actually made some progress under Liberal rule in the early 2000s, with decriminalization bills introduced in 2003 and 2004 by the governments of Jean Chrétien and Paul Martin. When Stephen Harper's Conservatives won in the 2006 election, the new government did not continue with this legislation.

In 2009, St-Maurice contested the 2009 Montreal municipal election, seeking the position of city councillor in Jeanne-Mance. He was ultimately unsuccessfully, losing to Nimâ Machouf of Projet Montreal.

Compassion Club and activism
St-Maurice has experienced trouble with the law when he was a full-time volunteer at the Compassion Club, an organization that provides marijuana to seriously ill individuals with a medical prescription. The first Montreal Compassion Club, based on those in Toronto and British Columbia, was opened on Rachel Street, near a police station.

Following a police raid, St-Maurice and his colleague Alexander Neron were accused of possession and trafficking of narcotics. Their lawyers pleaded that the Canadian legislation left a legal loophole, allowing certain individuals to possess cannabis for medicinal purposes, but not supplying the product in question. Judge Gilles Cadieux halted the proceedings against the two men in December 2002.

St-Maurice is the founder and director of the Montreal Compassion Centre, a medical marijuana facility in downtown Montreal. Prior to the legalization of cannabis in Canada, the centre was raided and shut down in 2011.

Electoral record

2009 Montreal Municipal Election: Jeanne-Mance

References

Living people
Canadian cannabis activists
Leaders of political parties in Canada
Bloc pot politicians
Marijuana Party (Canada) candidates for the Canadian House of Commons
Canadian political party founders
Year of birth missing (living people)
1960s births